The Party of Democratic Action is a political party in Kosovo.

At the legislative elections held on 8 June 2014, the party won 0.15% of the popular vote and none out of 120 seats.

The party represents the Bosniak minority of Kosovo and is affiliated to the Party of Democratic Action in Bosnia and Herzegovina.

See also
Vakat Coalition

References

Bosniak political parties
Party of Democratic Action
Political parties of minorities in Kosovo